Caridina is a genus of freshwater atyid shrimp. They are widely found in tropical or subtropical water in Asia, Oceania and Africa. They are filter-feeders and omnivorous scavengers. They range from 0.9–9.8 mm (C. cantonensis) to 1.2–7.4 mm (C. serrata) in carapace length.

Taxonomy and species

There is evidence for hybridization between sympatric taxa, requiring care when interpreting molecular phylogenetic analyses that do not use a large number of specimens. 

As of March 2022, the Integrated Taxonomic Information System lists the genus Caridina as having 340 species. These include the following species:

Caridina ablepsia Guo, Jiang & Zhang, 1992
Caridina acuta Liang, Chen & W.-X. Li, 2005
Caridina acutirostris Schenkel, 1902
Caridina africana Kingsley, 1883
Caridina alba J. Li & S. Li, 2010
Caridina alphonsi Bouvier, 1919
Caridina amnicolizambezi Richard & Clark, 2009
Caridina amoyensis Liang & Yan, 1977
Caridina angulata Bouvier, 1905
Caridina angustipes Guo & Liang, 2003
Caridina anislaq Cai, Choy & Ng, 2009
Caridina annandalei Kemp, 1918
Caridina apodosis Cai & N. K. Ng, 1999
Caridina appendiculata Jalihal & Shenoy, 1998
Caridina aruensis Roux, 1911
Caridina bakoensis Ng, 1995
Caridina bamaensis Liang & Yan, 1983
Caridina baojingensis Guo, He & Bai, 1992
Caridina barakoma de Mazancourt et al. 2020
Caridina batuan Cai, Choy & Ng, 2009
Caridina belazoniensis Richard & Clark, 2009
Caridina boehmei Klotz & von Rintelen, 2013
Caridina boholensis Cai, Choy & Ng, 2009
Caridina brachydactyla De Man, 1908
Caridina brevidactyla Roux, 1919
Caridina breviata N. K. Ng & Cai, 2000
Caridina brevicarpalis De Man, 1892
Caridina brevispina Liang & Yan, 1986
Caridina bruneiana Choy, 1992
Caridina buehleri Roux, 1934
Caridina buergersi Karge, von Rintelen & Klotz, 2010
Caridina buhi Cai & Shokita, 2006
Caridina bunyonyiensis Richard & Clark, 2005
Caridina burmensis Cai & Ng, 2000
Caridina butonensis Klotz & von Rintelen, 2013
Caridina caerulea von Rintelen & Cai, 2009
Caridina calmani Bouvier, 1919
Caridina camaro Cai, Choy & Ng, 2009
Caridina cantonensis Yü, 1938
Caridina caobangensis S.-Q. Li & Liang, 2002
Caridina carli Roux, 1931
Caridina cavalerieioides Liu & Liang in Liang, 2004
Caridina caverna Liang, Chen & W.-X. Li, 2005
Caridina cavernicola Liang & Zhou, 1993
Caridina cebuensis Cai & Shokita, 2006
Caridina celebensis De Man, 1892
Caridina celestinoi Blanco, 1939
Caridina chauhani Chopra & Tiwari, 1949
Caridina choiseul de Mazancourt et al. 2020
Caridina chishuiensis Cai & Yuan, 1996
Caridina clavipes Guo & Liang, 2003
Caridina clinata Cai, X. Q. Nguyên & Ng, 1999
Caridina cognata De Man, 1915
Caridina confusa Choy & Marshall, 1997
Caridina congoensis Richard & Clark, 2009
Caridina cornuta Liang & Yan, 1986
Caridina costai de Silva, 1982
Caridina crassipes Liang, 1993
Caridina crurispinata Gurney, 1984
Caridina cucphuongensis Đăng, 1980
Caridina curta Liang & Cai, 2000
Caridina demani Roux, 1911
Caridina demenica Cai & Li, 1997
Caridina dennerli von Rintelen & Cai, 2009
Caridina denticulata
Caridina dentifrons N. K. Ng & Cai, 2000
Caridina devaneyi Choy, 1991
Caridina dianchiensis Liang & Yan, 1985
Caridina disjuncta Cai & Liang, 1999
Caridina disparidentata Liang, Yan & Wang, 1984
Caridina ebuneus Richard & Clark, 2009
Caridina edulis Bouvier, 1904
Caridina elisabethae Karge, von Rintelen & Klotz, 2010
Caridina elliptica Cai & Yuan, 1996
Caridina elongapoda Liang & Yan, 1977
Caridina endehensis De Man, 1892
Caridina ensifera Schenkel, 1902
Caridina evae Richard & Clark, 2009
Caridina excavata Kemp, 1913
Caridina excavatoides Johnson, 1961
Caridina fasciata Hung, Chan & Yu, 1993
Caridina fecunda Roux, 1911
Caridina feixiana Cai & Liang, 1999
Caridina fernandoi Arudpragasam & Costa, 1962
Caridina fijiana Choy, 1983
Caridina flavilineata Đăng, 1975
Caridina formosae Hung, Chan & Yu, 1993
Caridina fossarum Heller, 1862
Caridina fusca Klotz, Wowor & von Rintelen, 2021
Caridina gabonensis Roux, 1927
Caridina ghanensis Richard & Clark, 2009
Caridina glaubrechti von Rintelen & Cai, 2009
Caridina glossopoda Liang, Guo & Gao, 1993
Caridina gordonae Richard & Clark, 2005
Caridina gortio Cai & Anker, 2004
Caridina gracilipes De Man, 1892
Caridina gracilirostris De Man, 1892
Caridina gracillima Lanchester, 1901
Caridina grandirostris Stimpson, 1860
Caridina guangxiensis Liang & Zhou, 1993
Caridina gueryi Marquet, Keith & Kalfatak, 2009
Caridina guiyangensis Liang, 2002
Caridina gurneyi Jalihal, Shenoy & Sankolli, 1984
Caridina hainanensis Liang & Yan, 1983
Caridina hanshanensis Tan, 1990
Caridina harmandi Bouvier, 1906
Caridina hodgarti Kemp, 1913
Caridina holthuisi von Rintelen & Cai, 2009
Caridina hongyanensis Cai & Yuan, 1996
Caridina hova Nobili, 1905
Caridina huananensis Liang, 2004
Caridina hubeiensis Liang & S.-Q. Li, 1993
Caridina hunanensis Liang, Guo & Gao, 1993
Caridina imitatrix Holthuis, 1970
Caridina intermedia de Mazancourt et al. 2020
Caridina jalihali Mariappan & Richard, 2006
Caridina jeani Cai, 2010
Caridina jiangxiensis Liang & Zheng, 1985
Caridina johnsoni Cai, Ng & Choy, 2007
Caridina kaombeflutilis Richard & Clark, 2010
Caridina kempi Jalihal, Shenoy & Sankolli, 1984
Caridina kilimae Hilgendorf, 1898
Caridina kunmingensis Z.-Z. Wang & Liang, 2001
Caridina kunnathurensis Richard & Chandran, 1994
Caridina laevis Heller, 1862
Caridina lamiana Holthuis, 1965
Caridina lanceifrons Yu, 1936
Caridina lanceolata Woltereck, 1937
Caridina lanzana Holthuis, 1980
Caridina laoagensis Blanco, 1939
Caridina laroeha Klotz & von Rintelen, 2013
Caridina leclerci Cai & Ng, 2009
Caridina leucosticta Stimpson, 1860
Caridina leytensis Blanco, 1939
Caridina liangi Jiang, Guo & Zhang, 2002
Caridina liaoi Cai, Choy & Ng, 2009
Caridina lilianae Klotz, Wowor & von Rintelen, 2021
Caridina lima Liang, Guo & Gao, 1993
Caridina linduensis Roux, 1904
Caridina lineorostris Richard & Clark, 2009
Caridina lingkonae Woltereck, 1937
Caridina lipalmaria Richard & Clark, 2010
Caridina liui Liang & Yan, 1986
Caridina lobocensis Cai, Choy & Ng, 2009
Caridina loehae Woltereck, 1937
Caridina longa Liang & Yan, 1985
Caridina longiacuta Guo & Wang, 2005
Caridina longicarpus Roux, 1926
Caridina longidigita Cai & Wowor, 2007
Caridina longifrons Cai & Ng, 2007
Caridina longirostris H. Milne-Edwards, 1837
Caridina lovoensis Roth-Woltereck, 1955
Caridina lufengensis Cai & Duan, 1998
Caridina lumilympha Richard & Clark, 2010
Caridina macrodentata Cai & Shokita, 2006
Caridina macrophora Kemp, 1918
Caridina maculata L. Wang, Liang & F. Li, 2008
Caridina maeana de Mazancourt et al. 2020
Caridina mahalona Cai, Wowor & Choy, 2009
Caridina malawensis Richard & Clark, 2009
Caridina malayensis Cai, Ng & Choy, 2007
Caridina marlenae Klotz, Wowor & von Rintelen, 2021
Caridina masapi Woltereck, 1937
Caridina mathiassi Silas & Jayachandran, 2010
Caridina mauritii Bouvier, 1912
Caridina mayamareenae Klotz, Wowor & von Rintelen, 2021
Caridina mccullochi Roux, 1926
Caridina medifolia Cai & Yuan, 1996
Caridina mengae Liang, 1993
Caridina mengaeoides Guo & Suzuki, 1996
Caridina menghaiensis Cai & Dai, 1999
Caridina meridionalis L. Wang, Liang & F. Li, 2008
Caridina mertoni Roux, 1911
Caridina mesofluminis Richard & Clark, 2009
Caridina mindanao Cai & Shokita, 2006
Caridina minidentata Cai & Anker, 2004
Caridina minnanica Liang, 2002
Caridina modiglianii Nobili, 1900
Caridina moeri Roth-Woltereck, 1984
Caridina mongziensis Liang, Yan & Z.-Z. Wang, 1987
Caridina multidentata Stimpson, 1860
Caridina nana de Mazancourt et al. 2020
Caridina nanaoensis Cai & N. K. Ng, 1999
Caridina natalensis Bouvier, 1925
Caridina natarajani Tiwari & R. S. Pillai, 1968
Caridina neglecta Cai & Ng, 2007
Caridina nguyeni S.-Q. Li & Liang, 2002
Caridina nilotica (Roux, 1833)
Caridina norvestica Holthuis, 1965
Caridina novaecaledoniae Roux, 1926
Caridina nudirostris Choy, 1984
Caridina okiamnis Richard & Clark, 2009
Caridina okinawa Cai & Shokita, 2006
Caridina oligospina Liang, Guo & Tang, 1999
Caridina opaensis Roux, 1904
Caridina palawanensis Cai & Shokita, 2006
Caridina panikkari Jalihal, Shenoy & Sankolli, 1984
Caridina papuana Nobili, 1905
Caridina paracornuta Cai & Yuan, 1996
Caridina pareparensis De Man, 1892
Caridina paratypus de Mazancourt et al. 2020
Caridina parvidentata Roux, 1904
Caridina parvirostris De Man, 1892
Caridina parvocula Gurney, 1984
Caridina parvula von Rintelen & Cai, 2009
Caridina paucidentata Wang & Liang, 2005
Caridina paucidentata L.-Q. Wang & Liang, 2005
Caridina pedicultrata Guo & Choy, 1994
Caridina peninsularis Kemp, 1918
Caridina petiti Roux, 1929
Caridina pingi Yü, 1938
Caridina pingioides Yü, 1938
Caridina piokerai de Mazancourt et al. 2020
Caridina pisuku de Mazancourt et al. 2020
Caridina plicata Liang, 2004
Caridina poarae de Mazancourt et al. 2020
Caridina poso Klotz, Wowor & von Rintelen, 2021
Caridina prashadi Tiwari & R. S. Pillai, 1971
Caridina pristis Roux, 1931
Caridina profundicola von Rintelen & Cai, 2009
Caridina propinqua De Man, 1908
Caridina pseudodenticulata Hung, Chan & Yu, 1993
Caridina pseudonilotica Richard & Clark, 2005
Caridina pseudoserrata Đăng & Ðỗ, 2007
Caridina qingyuanensis Guo & He, 2007
Caridina rajadhari Bouvier, 1918
Caridina rangoona Cai & Ng, 2000
Caridina rapaensis Edmondson, 1935
Caridina richtersi Thallwitz, 1892
Caridina roubaudi Bouvier, 1925
Caridina rouxi De Man, 1915
Caridina rubella Fujino & Shokita, 1975
Caridina rubropunctata Đăng & Ðỗ, 2007
Caridina samar Cai & Anker, 2004
Caridina sarasinorum Schenkel, 1902
Caridina schenkeli von Rintelen & Cai, 2009
Caridina semiblepsia Guo, Choy & Gui, 1996
Caridina serrata Stimpson, 1860
Caridina serratirostris De Man, 1892
Caridina shenoyi Jalihal & Sankolli in Jalihal, Shenoy & Sankolli, 1984
Caridina sikipozo de Mazancourt et al. 2020
Caridina shilinica Liang & Cai, 2000
Caridina similis Bouvier, 1904
Caridina simoni Bouvier, 1904
Caridina sinanensis Xu, Li, Zheng & Guo, 2020
Caridina sodenensis Richard & Clark, 2009
Caridina solearipes Guo & De Grave, 1997
Caridina songtaoensis Liang, 2004
Caridina spathulirostris Richters, 1880
Caridina spelunca Choy, 1996
Caridina sphyrapoda Liang & Zhou, 1993
Caridina spinalifrons Guo & De Grave, 1997
Caridina spinata Woltereck, 1937
Caridina spinipoda Liang, Hong & Yang, 1990
Caridina spinosipes Liang, Guo & Tang, 1999
Caridina spinula Choy & Marshall, 1997
Caridina spongicola Zitzler & Cai, 2006
Caridina steineri Cai, 2005
Caridina striata von Rintelen & Cai, 2009
Caridina subventralis Richard & Clark, 2005
Caridina sulawesi Cai & Ng, 2009
Caridina sumatianica Cai & Yuan, 1996
Caridina sumatrensis De Man, 1892
Caridina sundanella Holthuis, 1978
Caridina susuruflabra Richard & Clark, 2009
Caridina temasek Choy & Ng, 1991
Caridina tenuirostris Woltereck, 1937
Caridina thambipillai Johnson, 1961
Caridina thermophila Riek, 1953
Caridina thomasi von Rintelen, Karge & Klotz, 2008
Caridina timorensis De Man, 1893
Caridina togoensis Hilgendorf, 1893
Caridina tonkinensis Bouvier, 1919
Caridina trifasciata Yam & Cai, 2003
Caridina troglodytes Holthuis, 1978
Caridina troglophila Holthuis, 1965
Caridina tumida L. Wang, Liang & F. Li, 2008
Caridina tupaia de Mazancourt, Marquet & Keith, 2019
Caridina turipi de Mazancourt et al. 2020
Caridina typus H. Milne-Edwards, 1837
Caridina uminensis Đăng & Ðỗ, 2007
Caridina umtatensis Richard & Clark, 2009
Caridina unca Gurney, 1984
Caridina valencia Cai, Choy & Ng, 2009
Caridina venusta L. Wang, Liang & F. Li, 2008
Caridina vietriensis Đăng & Ðỗ, 2007
Caridina villadolidi Blanco, 1939
Caridina vitiensis Borradaile, 1899
Caridina weberi De Man, 1892
Caridina williamsi Cai & Ng, 2000
Caridina woltereckae Cai, Wowor & Choy, 2009
Caridina wumingensis Cai & N. K. Ng, 1999
Caridina wyckii (Hickson, 1888)
Caridina xiangnanensis X.-Y. Liu, Guo & Yu, 2006
Caridina xiphias Bouvier, 1925
Caridina yilong Cai & Liang, 1999
Caridina yulinica Cai & N. K. Ng, 1999
Caridina yunnanensis Yü, 1938
Caridina zebra Short, 1993
Caridina zeylanica Arudpragasam & Costa, 1962
Caridina zhejiangensis Liang & Zheng, 1985
Caridina zhongshanica Liang, 2004

A number of phylogenetic studies have questioned the monophyly of Caridina.

Threats and Conservation

As of March 2023, the IUCN Red List lists 56 Caridina species as threatened, with 18 listed as critically endangered, 5 listed as endangered, and 33 listed as vulnerable.
Of these, two (Caridina apodosis and Caridina yilong) are listed as possibly extinct and one (Caridina dennerli) is listed as possibly extinct in the wild.

References

External links

Red bee shrimp (aka crystal red shrimp)
Bee shrimp breeder

Atyidae
Taxa named by Henri Milne-Edwards

th:กุ้งเรดบี